José Carvalho (born June 11, 1964 in Salvador, Brazil) is a Brazilian screenwriter, script doctor and dramaturgy professor. He has written scripts for the big and small screens since the early 90s. Some of his most well-known works include Castelo Rá-Tim-Bum, Bruna Surfistinha, Faroeste Caboclo and the classic soap opera Xica da Silva. With an MA in Literature from PUC-Rio, Carvalho has taught courses at not only his alma-mater, but also renowned Brazilian production houses such as O2 Filmes (co-owned by Brazilian film director Fernando Meirelles) and Globo.

Carvalho is set to open his own screen/television writing school, Roteiraria, alongside partner Edu Ribeiro in April 2016.

Feature Length Screenplays

Brazilian Television Series

Script Doctoring

References

External links
 

Brazilian screenwriters